The 1888–89 Scottish Districts season is a record of all the  rugby union matches for Scotland's district teams.

It includes the East of Scotland District versus West of Scotland District trial match.

History

North of Scotland District arranged a match with Edinburgh opposition; this time against St. George. However they arrived in Edinburgh with only 14 men. They also planned a match against Glasgow District on 15 December 1888 at the Holburn Ground in Aberdeen.

Results

Inter-City

Glasgow District:

Edinburgh District:

Other Scottish matches

Edinburgh St. George:

North of Scotland District: 

East:

West:

English matches

No other District matches played.

International matches

No touring matches this season.

References

1888–89 in Scottish rugby union
Scottish Districts seasons